Anna Lagerquist (born 16 October 1993) is a Swedish handball player for Neptunes de Nantes and the Swedish national team.

References

External links

1993 births
Living people
Swedish female handball players
Lugi HF players
Sportspeople from Lund
Expatriate handball players
Swedish expatriate sportspeople in Denmark
Swedish expatriate sportspeople in Russia
Swedish expatriate sportspeople in France
Handball players at the 2020 Summer Olympics
Olympic handball players of Sweden